Chikkanarti is a village in Dharwad district of Karnataka, India.

Demographics 
As of the 2011 Census of India there were 268 households in Chikkanarti and a total population of 1,195 consisting of 604 males and 591 females. There were 112 children ages 0-6.

References

Villages in Dharwad district